The 1956 United States Senate election in Maryland was held on November 6, 1956. Incumbent Republican U.S. Senator John Marshall Butler was re-elected to a second term in office, defeating Democratic businessman George P. Mahoney.

, this was the last time Maryland voted simultaneously for a Republican presidential candidate and a Republican senate candidate.

Republican primary

Candidates
John Marshall Butler, incumbent Senator since 1951
Earl E.  Knepper
Henry J. Laque, Jr.

Results

Democratic primary

Candidates
George P. Mahoney, Baltimore businessman and 1952 nominee for Senate
Millard Tydings, former Senator from 1927 to 1951

Results

After winning the primary, Tydings was forced to withdraw from the race due to ill health. Mahoney replaced him on the general election ticket.

General election

Results

See also 
 1956 United States Senate elections

References 

Maryland
1956
United States Senate